TharnType 2: 7 Years of Love is a Thai BL television series starring Suppasit Jongcheveevat (Mew) and Kanawut Traipipattanapong (Gulf). It was previously aired on One 31 and LINE TV. The series is a sequel to TharnType: The Series.

Synopsis 
Type and Tharn have been together for seven years and enjoying life harmoniously but sometimes bickering. They still meet up with their friends from the university, but real life isn't always full of flowers and candies. They are now working adults and facing real life problems. Will they be able to overcome the struggles or crumble down?

Cast and characters

Main 

 Suppasit Jongcheveevat (Mew) as Tharn Thara Kirigun
 Kanawut Traipipattanapong (Gulf) as Type Thiwat Phawattakun

Supporting 

 Chalongrat Novsamrong (First) as Fiat
 Phachara Suansri (Ja) as Leo
 Napat Sinnakuan (Boat) as Champ
 Phat Prayunviwat (Jame) as Doctor Khunpol
 Tanatorn Saenangkanikorn (Title) as Phugun
 Sarunsathorn Tanawatcharawat (Haii) as Cirrus
 Becky Armstrong as Thanya
 Thanayut Thakoonauttaya (Tong) as Thorn
 Suttinut Uengtrakul (Mild) as Techno
 Petchpailin Chitcharoon (Name) as Amy

Production

Announcement 
In early February 2020, it was announced that a second season to TharnType: The Series would be produced. Skincare entrepreneur Golf Akaranun, who owns Hira Blue, made a surprise announcement during the TharnType fan meeting in Thailand that he will personally finance the production for the second season.

Casting and workshops 
Main casts Suppasit and Kanawut was confirmed to reprise their roles in the sequel. It was announced that auditions for new characters would take place on the February 22, 2020. The first workshop was held on May 3, 2020.

On Friday, June 12, 2020, the new cast members were announced via a Twitter post and a YouTube video. Documentary of audition process for second season's new characters titled Yicon Thailand starts airing on July 6, 2020.

Filming
Worship ceremony for the drama was held on June 29, 2020. New director Passawut Sukbua was also revealed for the first time since departure of Season 1 director, Bundit Sintanaparadee, from the series.
Filming starts on July 2, 2020.

Soundtrack

References

Thai boys' love television series
Thai comedy television series
2020s LGBT-related comedy television series
Fictional LGBT couples